In real analysis, a branch of mathematics, Bernstein's theorem states that every real-valued function on the half-line  that is totally monotone is a mixture of exponential functions.  In one important special case the mixture is a weighted average, or expected value.

for all nonnegative integers  and for all .  Another convention puts the opposite inequality in the above definition. 

the integral being a Riemann–Stieltjes integral.

In this form it is known as the Bernstein–Widder theorem, or Hausdorff–Bernstein–Widder theorem. Felix Hausdorff had earlier characterised completely monotone sequences. These are the sequences occurring in the Hausdorff moment problem.

Bernstein functions

Nonnegative functions whose derivative is completely monotone are called Bernstein functions.  Every Bernstein function has the Lévy–Khintchine representation:

References

External links
MathWorld page on completely monotonic functions

Theorems in real analysis
Theorems in measure theory